Instruments used specially in microbiology include:

Instrument list 

As well as those "used in microbiological sterilization and disinfection" (see relevant section).

Image gallery

References 

Medical equipment
Microbiology equipment